VAMAS is the Versailles project on advanced materials and standards that aim to establish the scientific foundation for standardised measurements, testing, specifications, and standards through international collaborative projects. VAMAS promotes global trade in goods depending on innovative materials technologies.

History 
The Versailles project on advanced materials and standards (VAMAS) was founded at the 1982 G7 Economic Summit. VAMAS support pre-standards research by providing the technical basis for measurements, testing, specifications, and standards.   Using interlaboratory studies, this will lead to new improved test procedures, refence materials and data, or algorithms and software with the researchers being drawn from VAMAS and non-VAMAS countries. Results of these activities are submitted to ISO, Regional or National Standards bodies.

VAMAS founding countries are (1982-1983): Canada, France, Germany, Italy, Japan, UK, USA, EC. Some countries enjoined later in 2007-2008:  Brazil, Mexico, Chinese Taipei, South Africa, Australia, South Korea, and India. China joined in 2013. 

VMAS is supported by leadership in National measurement institutes (NMIs) including National Institute for Materials Science (NIMS), National Institute of Standards and Technology (NIST)  National Physical laboratory (NPL), The British measurement and testing association (BMTA), International Bureau of Weights and Measures (BIPM), and Federal Institute for Materials Research and Testing (BAM).

VAMAS was linked with IEA in 2002, International Bureau of Weights and Measures (WMRIF) in 2008, BIPM in 2008, IEC in 2014, ISO in 2014, Asia Pacific Metrology Programme (APMP) in 2020. 85 national, regional or international standards, ~50 VAMAS reports, 5 ISO technology trends assessments (TTA), and ~600 publications resulted from VAMAS work.

VAMAS members can send up to three representatives to the steering committee which meets annually and consist of three representatives from each member.

Technical Work Areas 
VAMAS technical work areas (TWA) are list for active and completed.

International Interlaboratory Comparison 
Below examples of international interlaboratory comparison (ILC) and other studies done through VAMAS.

 2022	Raman spectroscopic analysis of CVD-grown graphene.
 2022	Measuring the number concentration of colloidal gold nanoparticles.
 2021	Evaluation of Time-of-Flight Secondary Ion Mass Spectrometry Spectra of Peptides by Random Forest with Amino Acid Labels.
 2020	Comparison on Surface analysis of oxide nanoparticles.
 2020	Intensity calibration for XPS instruments using low-density polyethylene.
 2016	Measuring the Thickness and Chemistry of Nanoparticle Coatings Using XPS and LEIS.
 2016	A unified approach to creep crack growth measurement.
 2010	Sample Cooling or Rotation Improves C60 Organic Depth Profiles of Multilayered Reference Samples.
 2001	ISO TTA Polycrystalline materials – Determination of residual stress by neutron diffraction.
 1995	Intercomparison on the upper critical field measurement in Nb-Ti wire.
 1992	Standardization for advanced materials: experience and strategies for the future.
 1990	Wear test methods.
 1988	Ion‐implanted reference materials for surface analysis.
 1985	Development of Standards for Surface Chemical Analysis.

See also 

International Organization for Standardization
National Physical Laboratory (United Kingdom)
International Bureau of Weights and Measures
 Standard (metrology)

References

External links 

 

Standards (metrology)
Research institutes
Materials science institutes